Since 2017, the Parliament of Norway has consisted of 169 members from 9 parties, elected during the 2017 Norwegian parliamentary election on 11 September. The center-right block retained a reduced majority of seats, allowing the coalition of the largest right-wing parties, the Conservative Party (45 members) and the Progress Party (27 members) to continue under Erna Solberg. The Liberal Party (8 members) joined the coalition in January 2018 and the Christian Democratic Party (8 members) in 2019. The opposition consisted of the Labour Party (49 members), the Centre Party (19 members), the Socialist Left Party (11 members), the Green Party (1 member) and the Red Party (1 member).

Members of the Parliament of Norway are elected based on party-list proportional representation in plural member constituencies. The representatives from different political parties were elected from 19 constituencies, which are identical to the 19 counties. The electorate did not vote for individuals but rather for party lists, with a ranked list of candidates nominated by the party. This means that the person on top of the list would get the seat unless the voter alters the ballot. Parties could nominate candidates from outside their own constituency, and even Norwegian citizens currently living abroad.

The Sainte-Laguë method was used for allocating parliamentary seats to parties. As a result, the percentage of representatives was roughly equal to the nationwide percentage of votes. Conversely, if a party's initial representation in Parliament was proportionally less than its share of votes, the party might seat more representatives through leveling seats, provided that the nationwide percentage is above the election threshold, at 4 percent. Since 2005, nineteen seats in each parliament have been allocated via the leveling system.

If a representative is unable to participate for whatever reason, his or her seat is filled by a candidate from the same party-list — in other words, there are no by-elections. Representatives who die during their term are replaced permanently, whereas representatives who are appointed to a government position, such as government minister (cabinet member) or state secretary, are replaced by a deputy until the representative no longer holds the government position. Deputy representatives also step in during short-term absences, like when a representative travels abroad with a parliamentary work group or is absent for health reasons.

Representatives
The following is a list of members elected to the parliament in the 2017 election. It consists of the representative's name, party, and constituency.

References

2017 elections in Europe
Lists of members of the Storting